Todd Graff (born October 22, 1959) is an American actor, writer and director, best known for his 2003 independent film Camp and his role as Alan "Hippy" Carnes in the 1989 science fiction film The Abyss.

Early life
Graff was born in New York City, the son of Judith Clarice (née Oxhorn), a piano teacher and choirmaster, and Jerome Lawrence Graff, a musician. His sister is actress Ilene Graff.

Career
Graff is an alumnus both as a camper and counselor of the Stagedoor Manor performing arts summer camp in upstate New York. He sang on the original-cast albums of Sesame Street (1970) and the follow-up Sesame Street 2 (1971). He garnered fame in  1975 when he joined the cast of the PBS children's television series The Electric Company. Playing the role of Jesse, a member of the Short Circus, he remained with the show to the end of its production in 1977 (replacing Stephen Gustafson).

Graff's writing credits include Camp, Used People, The Vanishing, and The Beautician and the Beast. Graff acted in several films including Death to Smoochy, Dominick and Eugene, Strange Days, Not Quite Paradise, and The Abyss.

He was nominated for a Tony Award for his portrayal of Danny in Broadway's Baby in   1984. He starred in the 1987 Off-Broadway musical Birds of Paradise as Homer. In 2006, Graff directed the stage musical 13 by Jason Robert Brown and Dan Elish at the Mark Taper Forum. In 2009, he co-wrote and directed the film Bandslam. In 2012 he wrote and directed the film Joyful Noise.

Filmography

Movies

TV series

Award nominations
1984 Tony Award nominee as Featured Actor in a Musical for Baby
1984 Won Theatre World Award for Baby (musical)
2003 Sundance Film Festival Grand Jury Prize nominee for Camp

TV
 Made in Hollywood: Teen Edition (2012)
 Made in Hollywood (2011)
 Hollywood Singing & Dancing: A Musical History – 1980s, 1990s and 2000s (2009) 
 Hollywood Singing & Dancing: A Musical History – 1970's (2009)
 Under Pressure: Making 'The Abyss (1993)

Writer/Director
 Used People (1992; writer only)
  (1993; writer only)
 The Vanishing (1993; writer only)
 Angie (1994; writer only)
 The Beautician and the Beast (1997; writer only)
 Camp (2003; director)
 Bandslam (2009; director)
 Joyful Noise (2012; director)

References

External links

Todd Graff infosite (in Spanish)

1959 births
Male actors from New York City
American male child actors
American male film actors
Film directors from New York City
Screenwriters from New York (state)
Living people
American gay actors
LGBT film directors